Németbánya (formerly Németh-Bánya;  or) is a village in Veszprém county, Hungary.

Nearby municipalities 
 Csehbánya ("Bohemian mine")
 Farkasgyepű

External links 
 Street map (Hungarian)

Populated places in Veszprém County
Hungarian German communities